Langenberg is a municipality in the district of Gütersloh in the state of North Rhine-Westphalia, Germany. It is located in the Teutoburg Forest, approx. 15 km south-west of Gütersloh and 30 km west of Paderborn.

References